Otothyropsis is a genus of armored catfishes native to South America.

Species
There are currently 5 recognized species in this genus:
 Otothyropsis alicula Lippert, Calegari & Reis, 2014 
 Otothyropsis biamnicus Calegari, Lehmann A. & Reis, 2013 
 Otothyropsis marapoama Ribeiro, Carvalho & Melo, 2005
 Otothyropsis piribebuy Calegari, Lehmann A. & Reis, 2011
 Otothyropsis polyodon Calegari, Lehmann A. & Reis, 2013

References

Otothyrinae
Fish of South America
Catfish genera
Freshwater fish genera